The following is a list of Michigan State Historic Sites in Ingham County, Michigan. Sites marked with a dagger (†) are also listed on the National Register of Historic Places in Ingham County, Michigan. Those with a double dagger (‡) are also designated National Historic Landmarks.



Current listings

See also
 National Register of Historic Places listings in Ingham County, Michigan

Sources
 Historic Sites Online – Ingham County. Michigan State Housing Developmental Authority. Accessed February 5, 2011.

References

 
State Historic Sites
Tourist attractions in Ingham County, Michigan